William Thomas Granahan (July 26, 1895 – May 25, 1956) was a Democratic politician from the U.S. state of Pennsylvania, most prominently serving in the U.S. House of Representatives from 1945–47 and 1949-56.

Biography
Granahan was born in Philadelphia, Pennsylvania, all four of his grandparents were Irish immigrants. He attended parochial schools and La Salle Extension University in Chicago, Illinois. During World War I, he was a private in the U.S. Army, serving in the Army of Occupation in Germany. After the war, he entered the building business.

In the late 1930s, he entered the world of Democratic politics, serving as a member of the state party committee from 1938-42. In 1940, he entered the state government, becoming the state supervisor of the inheritance tax, and in 1941 he moved up to become chief disbursing officer of the state's treasury.

After being sent to Congress in the 1944 elections, he lost a bid for reelection, defeated by Republican Robert N. McGarvey. However, he took back the seat from Congressman McGarvey two years later, and went on to serve four more terms until dying from a heart seizure following a minor abdominal surgery at Fitzgerald Mercy Hospital in Darby, Pennsylvania.  He was succeeded after his death by his wife, Kathryn E. Granahan.

See also
 List of United States Congress members who died in office (1950–99)

References

External links
 Retrieved on May 15, 2009
The Political Graveyard

1895 births
1956 deaths
American people of Irish descent
Politicians from Philadelphia
United States Army personnel of World War I
La Salle Extension University alumni
Democratic Party members of the United States House of Representatives from Pennsylvania
20th-century American politicians